The ConferenceBike is a 7-seat human powered vehicle created by artist Eric Staller and manufactured in The Netherlands. One person steers and all may pedal . The bike has a circular jointed drive-shaft and rack & pinion steering. In most countries, it has the same legal status as a bicycle. There are now over 300 ConferenceBikes in 18 countries.

Purpose

The ConferenceBike is used primarily for tourism, and used as a team building tool at corporations and university campuses. Google Inc. has nine bikes in use for transportation and team building on their campus.

The Washington, D.C. Veterans Health Administration Medical Center has a ConferenceBike that was donated by Eric Staller's father. It is used by employees and veterans for recreational and fundraising events.

Specifications

Length: 
Width:  
Weight:

See also 
 Outline of cycling
 Party Bike

References

External links
  Official ConferenceBike website
 Eric Staller Design Patent
  Personal website of Eric Staller

Cycle types